Adolf Baum may refer to:
Adolf Baum (Luftwaffe officer), (1916–1942), German Luftwaffe officer
Adolf Baum (Heer officer), (1914–2003), German Heer (Army) officer